John Wesley Bailey Jr. (September 15, 1907 – February 1, 1980) was an American actor and daytime game show host. He was born in Hampton, Iowa, and died in Santa Monica, California.

Career
A former vaudeville musician and World's Fair barker, Bailey is best remembered as the host of Queen for a Day, a daytime game show which first aired on the Mutual Broadcasting System in 1945 and later moved to television, where it ran locally in the Los Angeles area from 1948 through 1955, on the NBC Television network from January 3, 1956 to September 2, 1960, and on the ABC network from September 5, 1960 to October 2, 1964. Each episode started with a different introduction (some of which were parodies of other popular shows of the time period), but inevitably the opening would resolve when Bailey pointed to the camera (and the audience) and loudly asked, "Would you like to be Queen for a Day?" as the live audience, mostly women, cheered.

Prior to his success with Queen for a Day, Bailey had a varied career, including "playing with jazz bands, directing musical comedy, tent shows and barking for the World's Fair in Chicago in 1933." He was an announcer for several radio programs, including The Adventures of Ozzie and Harriet, Duffy's Tavern, and Meet the Missus.

Bailey also hosted the television game shows Place the Face (1953 – February 1954) and Truth or Consequences from 1954 to 1956. 

His other work in television included appearances in episodes of The Ford Show, Starring Tennessee Ernie Ford, Mister Ed, Green Acres, I Dream of Jeannie, Gunsmoke, and Ironside, plus narration for the Walt Disney organization. He had a small part in the Frank Capra film It's a Wonderful Life and he also toured the country in musical stage productions, such as Hello Dolly, The Sound of Music, and The Music Man. 
 
Bailey joined Alcoholics Anonymous around 1948 and was a public supporting member of the organization for more than 30 years.

He was awarded two stars on the Hollywood Walk of Fame—one for his radio career, at 1708 Vine Street, and one for his work in television, at 6411 Hollywood Boulevard in Hollywood, California.

Family
Bailey was preceded in death by his first wife, Carol. He was survived by his second wife, Jean. He had no children.

Filmography

References

External links

1907 births
1980 deaths
People from Hampton, Iowa
American game show hosts
American male film actors
American male television actors
20th-century American male actors
Male actors from Iowa